Liu Jing (born March 8, 1990, in Beijing) is a Chinese swimmer, who competed for Team China at the 2008 and 2012 Summer Olympics. Her brother, Liu Yuchen, is a badminton player.

Major achievements
2003 National Intercity Games preliminaries - 1st 400m IM;
2003/2005/2006 National Championships - 3rd 400m IM/2nd 200m IM/2nd 400m IM;
2003 National Short-Course Championships - 4th 400m IM;
2004 World Cup - 2nd 400m medley;
2005 Mare Nostrum 2005 series - 1st 200m/400m IM;
2007 National Intercity Games - 1st 4 × 200 m free relay, 2nd 200m IM
2008 Olympics - 25th 400m IM
2009 Asian Swimming Championships - 2nd 200m IM, 1st 400m IM

See also
China at the 2012 Summer Olympics - Swimming

References
http://2008teamchina.olympic.cn/index.php/personview/personsen/1279

1990 births
Living people
Chinese female medley swimmers
Olympic swimmers of China
Swimmers from Beijing
Swimmers at the 2008 Summer Olympics
Swimmers at the 2012 Summer Olympics
World record holders in swimming
Chinese female freestyle swimmers
World Aquatics Championships medalists in swimming
Medalists at the FINA World Swimming Championships (25 m)
Asian Games medalists in swimming
Swimmers at the 2010 Asian Games
Universiade medalists in swimming
Asian Games gold medalists for China
Asian Games silver medalists for China
Medalists at the 2010 Asian Games
Universiade bronze medalists for China
Medalists at the 2011 Summer Universiade
21st-century Chinese women